Mim Mosaddeak is a Bangladeshi cricketer. He made his first-class debut for Rangpur Division in the 2017–18 National Cricket League on 29 September 2017. He made his List A debut on 14 April 2022, for Gazi Group cricketers in the 2021–22 Dhaka Premier Division Cricket League.

Personal life
On 21 October 2020, he married Bangladesh women's cricketer Sanjida Islam.

References

External links
 

Year of birth missing (living people)
Living people
Bangladeshi cricketers
Place of birth missing (living people)
Rangpur Division cricketers